Joanna Scheuring-Wielgus (born 8 February 1972) is a Polish politician. She is a member of the Sejm for The Left political coalition.

References

1972 births
Living people
People from Toruń
Nicolaus Copernicus University in Toruń alumni
Members of the Polish Sejm 2015–2019
Members of the Polish Sejm 2019–2023
Modern (political party) politicians
Women members of the Sejm of the Republic of Poland
21st-century Polish women politicians